The Vikings, also known as Keith Powell & the Vikings or Carl Wayne & the Vikings, were an English rock group from Birmingham, notable for including at various times Carl Wayne, Chris 'Ace' Kefford, Bev Bevan who would later become founders of The Move.

The Vikings started as a skiffle group in the Nechells district of Birmingham in the spring of 1957, formed by Terry Wallace and his friends George Jenkins, John "Bango" Badrick, Allan Compton, John Jolley, and Terry Smith, with their first gig being at the local Cromwell Street Working Men's Club.

They released three singles on Pye in the mid-1960s, one of which – "Your Loving Ways" – was written by the group.

References

Bibliography

English rock music groups
Musical groups from Birmingham, West Midlands